The 107th Independent Brigade of the Territorial Defense Forces is a military formation of the Territorial Defense Forces of Ukraine in Chernivtsi Oblast. It is part of Operational Command West.

History

Formation 
On 1 March, 2018 Chernivtsi region's chief enlistment officer, Volodymyr Shvediuk announced that the brigade would be formed. He said 6 battalions would be created in the main raions including 1 battalion in Chernivtsi.

Russo-Ukrainian War

2022 Russian invasion of Ukraine
4 days after the invasion, the press office of Chernivtsi City Council announced that all units of Brigade were fully staffed.
On April 13 2022, Brigade commander Lieutenant Colonel Andriy Tsisak announced that soldiers from the brigade had captured a Russian tank. After repairs that tank was sent to strengthen 94th battalion.

Structure 
As of 2022 the brigade's structure is as follows:
 Headquarters
 92nd Territorial Defense Battalion (Chernivtsi) А7185
 93rd Territorial Defense Battalion (Vyzhnytsia) А7186
 94th Territorial Defense Battalion (Storozhynets) А7187
 95th Territorial Defense Battalion (Kitsman) А7188
 96th Territorial Defense Battalion (Novoselytsia) А7219
 97th Territorial Defense Battalion (Sokyriany) А7220
 Counter-Sabotage Company
 Engineering Company
 Communication Company
 Logistics Company
 Mortar Battery

Commanders 
 Colonel Tsisak Andriy August 2021-current

See also 
 Territorial Defense Forces of the Armed Forces of Ukraine

References 

Territorial defense Brigades of Ukraine
2018 establishments in Ukraine
Military units and formations established in 2018